Ezequiel Mosquera Míguez (born 19 November 1975) is a Spanish former road bicycle racer. He has finished in the top 5 of the Vuelta a España in all appearances, and finished second in 2010, after putting in a strong time trial and winning the penultimate stage to Bola del Mundo. After testing positive for hydroxyethyl starch in the race, he was suspended by the UCI and his results from the 2010 Vuelta were annulled.

2010 Vuelta a España

On September 30, 2010 UCI reported that Mosquera and his teammate David García Dapena tested positive for hydroxyethyl starch during the 2010 Vuelta. Hydroxyethyl starch is associated with endurance athletes trying to cover up erythropoietin usage.

His new team  did not allow him to ride while he was still under investigation. In April 2011, the Union Cycliste Internationale sent his dossier to the Spanish cycling authorities, who opened their own investigation in July, and suspended Mosquera in November. He was suspended for two years, not counting the 2011 season where he did not ride.  fired him after his suspension became official.

Major results

2005
 1st Stage 3 Vuelta a La Rioja
2007
 3rd Overall Vuelta a Mallorca
 5th Overall Vuelta a España
2008
 1st  Overall Clasica de Alcobendas
1st Stage 1
 4th Overall Vuelta a España
 5th Overall Vuelta a Burgos
 9th Overall Tour of the Basque Country
2009
 4th Overall Vuelta a Burgos
1st Stage 5
 5th Overall Vuelta a España
2010
 2nd Overall Vuelta a España
1st Stage 20
 2nd Overall Vuelta a Burgos
 3rd Overall Vuelta a Castilla y León
 4th Overall Vuelta a Asturias

Grand Tour general classification results timeline

References

External links 

Palmares at Cycling Base

1975 births
Living people
People from Santiago (comarca)
Sportspeople from the Province of A Coruña
Cyclists from Galicia (Spain)
Spanish Vuelta a España stage winners
Spanish male cyclists
Doping cases in cycling
Spanish sportspeople in doping cases